Oak Ridge High School, Oakridge High School, or Oakridge School may refer to a school:

Canada 
Oakridge High School (London, Ontario)

United States 

Oak Ridge High School (Oak Ridge, Tennessee), Oak Ridge, Tennessee
Oak Ridge High School (El Dorado Hills, California), El Dorado Hills, California
Oak Ridge High School (Oak Ridge, Louisiana), in Morehouse Parish
Oak Ridge High School (Missouri), Oak Ridge, Missouri
Oak Ridge Central Campus in Randolph County, Arkansas
Oak Ridge High School (Montgomery County, Texas), Conroe, Texas
Oak Ridge High School (Orlando, Florida), Orlando, Florida
Oakridge High School (Muskegon, Michigan), Muskegon, Michigan
Oakridge High School (Oregon), Oakridge, Oregon
The Oakridge School, Arlington, Texas

See also 

Oak Ridge (disambiguation)